Johann Böhm  (born 18 October 1937 in Dasnice, Czechoslovakia) is a German politician, representative of the Christian Social Union of Bavaria (CSU). He was a member of the Landtag of Bavaria from 1974 to 2003 and was President of the Landtag of Bavaria from 1994 to 2003.

See also
List of Bavarian Christian Social Union politicians

References

1937 births
Living people
People from Sokolov District
Sudeten German people
Christian Social Union in Bavaria politicians
Members of the Landtag of Bavaria
Cartellverband members
University of Würzburg alumni
Knights Commander of the Order of Merit of the Federal Republic of Germany